Gardom Lake is a fresh water lake in Enderby and Salmon Arm, British Columbia.

Recreation 
Gardom Lake is home to a park, a Bible camp and a Royal Canadian Legion Camp. It is a popular fishing destination. Gardom Lake has a population of rainbow trout, which are stocked each year and are purely game fish.

Geological information
Gardom Lake is on average 8.8 m. deep but has a maximum depth of 23.7 m. The total area of the lake is 1.27 km2

Ecological information

Along with a population of rainbow trout, Gardom Lake also has red painted turtles, black bears, bald eagles, white-tailed deer, loons, mallard ducks, hummingbirds and occasionally barn owls.

The turtles hatch in May–June and make their way to the lake, some times the mothers bury their eggs on dirt roads. Also migratory birds stop at Gardom Lake to feast on the local trout population. Bald eagles, deer and bears stay year-round. In addition to these animals, every third spring barn owls arrive to raise their chicks.

References 

Lakes of British Columbia
Lakes of the Okanagan
Salmon Arm
Kamloops Division Yale Land District